Malaysia competed in the 1971 Southeast Asian Peninsular Games as the host nation in Kuala Lumpur from 6 to 13 December 1971.

Medal summary

Medals by sport

Medallists

References

1971 Southeast Asian Peninsular Games
1971